Clorotepine (brand names Clotepin, Clopiben), also known as octoclothepin or octoclothepine, is an antipsychotic of the tricyclic group which was derived from perathiepin in 1965 and marketed in the Czech Republic by Spofa in or around 1971 for the treatment of schizophrenic psychosis.

Clorotepine is known to have high affinity for the dopamine D1, D2, D3, and D4 receptors, the serotonin 5-HT2A, 5-HT2B, 5-HT2C, 5-HT6, and 5-HT7 receptors, the α1A-, α1B-, and α1D-adrenergic receptors, and the histamine H1 receptors, where it has been it has been confirmed to act as an antagonist (or inverse agonist) at most sites (and likely is as such at all of them based on structure–activity relationships), and it also blocks the reuptake of norepinephrine via inhibition of the norepinephrine transporter.

Due to its very potent activity at the D2 receptor, along with tefludazine, clorotepine was used as the basis for developing a 3-dimensional (3D) pharmacophore for D2 receptor antagonists.

See also
 Metitepine
 Perathiepin

References

Antipsychotics
Chloroarenes
Dibenzothiepines
Diphenylethylpiperazines
Sedatives